Brunello Iacopetta (born 28 October 1984) is an Italian-Swiss football manager who is currently the manager of FC Wil. He also holds Italian citizenship.

Managerial career 
Iacopetta began his career managing various youth teams of FC Frauenfeld in 2002, before switching to FC Wil youth in 2009. He consequently worked his way up the youth teams of FC St. Gallen, starting with the U-16s up to the U-21 team, before being announced as the manager of Promotion League team FC Rapperswil-Jona in 2020.

In November 2021, he replaced Alex Frei as manager of FC Wil.

References 

Swiss football managers
Living people
1984 births
People from Frauenfeld
Swiss-Italian people
Sportspeople from Thurgau